The 2020–21 UEFA Youth League was scheduled to be the eighth season of the UEFA Youth League, a European youth club football competition organised by UEFA.

As in previous years, the final tournament, consisting of the semi-finals and final, would originally have been played at the Colovray Stadium in Nyon, Switzerland; however, due to the continuing COVID-19 pandemic in Europe, the format of the competition was changed to a straight knockout tournament starting from 2 March 2021. On 17 February 2021, the UEFA Executive Committee cancelled the tournament.

Teams
A total of 64 teams from at least 32 of the 55 UEFA member associations could enter the 2020–21 UEFA Youth League. They were split into two sections, each with 32 teams:
UEFA Champions League Path: The youth teams of the 32 clubs which qualified for the 2020–21 UEFA Champions League group stage entered the UEFA Champions League Path. If there was a vacancy (youth teams not entering), it was filled by a team defined by UEFA.
Domestic Champions Path: The youth domestic champions (U17, U18 or U19) of the top 32 associations according to their 2019 UEFA country coefficients entered the Domestic Champions Path. If there was a vacancy (associations with no youth domestic competition, as well as youth domestic champions already included in the UEFA Champions League path), it was first filled by the title holders should they had not yet qualified, and then by the youth domestic champions of the next association in the UEFA ranking.

In early April 2020, UEFA announced that due to the COVID-19 pandemic, the deadline for entering the tournament had been postponed until further notice.

All Domestic Champions Path teams in italics were declared champions or selected to play by the national association following an abandoned season due to the COVID-19 pandemic in Europe, and were subject to approval by UEFA as per the guidelines for entry to European competitions in response to the COVID-19 pandemic.

The list of participants, from 36 associations, was published by UEFA on 7 December 2020. Celta Vigo, Lazio, 1. FC Köln, Angers, Chertanovo Moscow, İstanbul Başakşehir, AZ, Odense, Dinamo Minsk, Górnik Zabrze, Olimpija Ljubljana, Ferencváros, Győri ETO, Apolonia and Waterford would have made their tournament debuts.

Notes

Squads
Players had to be born on or after 1 January 2002, with a maximum of five players born between 1 January 2001 and 31 December 2001 allowed in the 40-player squad, and a maximum of three of these players allowed per each match.

Schedule
The schedule of the competition was planned as follows (all draws were planned to be held at the UEFA headquarters in Nyon, Switzerland). The tournament would have originally started in September 2020, but was initially delayed to October due to the COVID-19 pandemic in Europe, which caused the group stage of the 2020–21 UEFA Champions League to be postponed. However, due to the continuing pandemic in Europe, UEFA announced a new format on 24 September 2020. Instead of a group stage in the UEFA Champions League Path and two-legged ties in the Domestic Champions Path, all rounds would have been played as single-legged knockout matches.

The schedule of the competition announced in June 2020, under the original format, was planned as follows (all draws were planned to be held at the UEFA headquarters in Nyon, Switzerland, unless stated otherwise).

Round of 64

Draw
The draw for the round of 64 was held on 27 January 2021 (12:00 CET for UEFA Champions League Path and 12:25 CET for Domestic Champions Path). The 32 teams from the UEFA Champions League Path and the 32 teams from the Domestic Champions Path were split, and in both paths, there were no seedings, but UEFA divided the teams in each path into four groups of eight teams, which would be drawn separately. The first team drawn in each tie would have been the home team. Teams from the same association in the UEFA Champions League Path could not be drawn against each other, and based on political restrictions, teams from Russia and Ukraine could not be drawn against each other.

Summary
The matches would have been played on 24 February, 2, 3 and 4 March 2021.

|+UEFA Champions League Path

|}

|+Domestic Champions Path

|}

Round of 32
The draw for the round of 32 would have been held on 12 March 2021 (morning). The 16 winners of the round of 64 from the UEFA Champions League Path and the 16 winners of the round of 64 from the Domestic Champions Path are split, and in both paths, there are no seedings. Teams from the same association in the UEFA Champions League Path cannot be drawn against each other.

The matches would have been played on 6 and 7 April 2021.

Round of 16
The draw for the round of 16 onwards would have been held on 12 March 2021 (afternoon). The eight winners of the round of 32 from the UEFA Champions League Path and the eight winners of the round of 32 from the Domestic Champions Path, whose identity is not known at the time of draw, would have been combined starting from the round of 16.

The matches would have been played on 20 and 21 April 2021.

Quarter-finals
The matches would have been played on 4 and 5 May 2021.

Semi-finals
The matches would have been played on 17 May 2021 at the Colovray Stadium, Nyon.

Final
The match would have been played on 20 May 2021 at the Colovray Stadium, Nyon.

References

External links

 
Youth
2020-21
2021 in youth association football
Association football events cancelled due to the COVID-19 pandemic